Major-General Richard Deare Furley Oldman  (31 June 1877 – 1943) was a British Army officer.

Military career
Educated at Haileybury, Oldman was commissioned into the Norfolk Regiment on 20 February 1897. He saw action in operations in Northern Nigeria in 1903 and 1904 for which he was appointed a Companion of the Distinguished Service Order. He became commanding officer of the 1st Battalion of the Cheshire Regiment on the Western Front in 1915, commander of 117th Infantry Brigade on the Western Front in 1916 and commander of 15th Infantry Brigade on the Western Front in November 1917. He was wounded in May 1918 and gassed in June 1918. After the war he became commander of 2nd Infantry Brigade in August 1919, commander of 6th Infantry Brigade in October 1926 and General Officer Commanding 47th (2nd London) Division in January 1931 before retiring in December 1934.

References

1877 births
1943 deaths
Royal Norfolk Regiment officers
Companions of the Order of the Bath
Companions of the Order of St Michael and St George
Companions of the Distinguished Service Order
British Army generals of World War I
People educated at Haileybury and Imperial Service College
British Army major generals